Red is a Canadian short drama film, directed by Maxime Giroux and released in 2005. The film stars Martin Dubreuil as Christian, a man struggling with alcoholism who opens up about his feelings to his mother (Monique Pion) during a shopping trip to Ikea.

The film won the Genie Award for Best Live Action Short Drama at the 27th Genie Awards, and was a shortlisted Jutra Award nominee for Best Short Film at the 8th Jutra Awards.

References

External links
 

2005 films
Canadian drama short films
Films directed by Maxime Giroux
Best Live Action Short Drama Genie and Canadian Screen Award winners
French-language Canadian films
2000s Canadian films